Iraj alternatively Iradj is a Persian given name. People with the name include:

Given name

People
 Iraj Afshar (1925–2011), Iranian historian and scholar
 Iraj Danaeifard (1951–2018), Iranian footballer
 Iraj Eskandari (1907–1985), Iranian politician
 Iraj Etesam (1931–2022), Iranian architect and author
 Iradj Fazel (born 1939), Iranian surgeon and academic
 Iraj Ghaderi (1934–2012), Iranian actor
 Iraj Janatie Ataie (born 1947), Iranian poet, lyricist and playwright
 Iraj, Hossein Khajeh Amiri (born 1933), Persian traditional vocalist
 Iraj Kalantari Taleghani (1937/1938–2023) , Iranian architect
 Iraj Lalezari (1930–2019), Iranian Jewish academic 
 Iraj Malekpour, Iranian academic and physicist
 Iraj Mirza (1874–1926), Iranian poet
 Iraj Pezeshkzad 1927–2022), Iranian novelist
 Iraj Rad (born 1945), Iranian actor
 Iraj Raminfar (born 1949), Iranian art director
 Iraj Vahidi (1927–2022), Iranian engineer and politician
 Iraj Weeraratne (born 1981), Sri Lankan R&B artist

Fictional characters
Iraj (Shahnameh), character in Ferdowsi's Shahnameh

Persian masculine given names